Tridactyle is a genus of flowering plants from the orchid family, Orchidaceae. It has about 60-70 known species, all native to sub-Saharan Africa.

Species
Tridactyle species accepted by the Plants of the World Online as of February 2021:

Tridactyle anthomaniaca 
Tridactyle armeniaca 
Tridactyle aurantiopunctata 
Tridactyle bicaudata 
Tridactyle brevicalcarata 
Tridactyle brevifolia 
Tridactyle crassifolia 
Tridactyle cruciformis 
Tridactyle eggelingii 
Tridactyle exellii 
Tridactyle filifolia 
Tridactyle fimbriatipetala 
Tridactyle flabellata 
Tridactyle fusifera 
Tridactyle gentilii 
Tridactyle hurungweensis 
Tridactyle inaequilonga 
Tridactyle inflata 
Tridactyle lagosensis 
Tridactyle latifolia 
Tridactyle laurentii 
Tridactyle lisowskii 
Tridactyle minuta 
Tridactyle minutifolia 
Tridactyle muriculata 
Tridactyle nalaensis 
Tridactyle nanne-ritzkae 
Tridactyle nigrescens 
Tridactyle oblongifolia 
Tridactyle pentalobata 
Tridactyle phaeocephala 
Tridactyle scottellii 
Tridactyle stevartiana 
Tridactyle stipulata 
Tridactyle thomensis 
Tridactyle translucens 
Tridactyle tridactylites 
Tridactyle tridentata 
Tridactyle trimikeorum 
Tridactyle truncatiloba 
Tridactyle unguiculata 
Tridactyle vanderlaaniana 
Tridactyle verrucosa 
Tridactyle virginea 
Tridactyle virgula

See also
 List of Orchidaceae genera

References

External links
 

Vandeae genera
Angraecinae
Orchids of Africa